The 1960 Utah gubernatorial election was held on November 8, 1960. Republican incumbent George Dewey Clyde defeated Democratic nominee William Arthur Barlocker with 52.66% of the vote.

This was the last time until 1984 that Utah would elect a Republican governor.

General election

Candidates
William Arthur Barlocker, Democratic
George Dewey Clyde, Republican

Results

References

1960
Utah
Gubernatorial